Lee Cormie (born 8 February 1992) is an Australian actor known for his starring roles in Darkness Falls and Australian film December Boys alongside Daniel Radcliffe.

Biography
Cormie was educated at Mentone Grammar School in the south-east suburbs of Melbourne. His first film appearance was in the supernatural horror film Darkness Falls (2003). He then appeared as "Misty" in December Boys .

Cormie has also appeared as a main role in Channel 10 series Worst Best Friends and in special guest roles in Blue Heelers, Fergus McPhail and Holly's Heroes. His recent credits include Joseph Debs in Australian telemovie Underbelly: Files 'Tell Them Lucifer Was Here'.

Filmography

External links
IMDB Official Page

References

People educated at Mentone Grammar School
Living people
1992 births
Male actors from Melbourne
21st-century Australian male actors